Vyricherla Kishore Chandra Suryanarayana Deo (born 15 February 1947) is an Indian politician and a member of the Telugu Desam Party political party. He has been elected to the Lok Sabha for five times, and has also held one term in the Rajya Sabha. From July 2011 to May 2014, he was the Union Cabinet Minister for Tribal Affairs and Panchayati Raj.

Early life
Kishore Chandra Deo was born in Kurupam to Raja V. Durgaprasad Deo of Kurupam and Rani (now,Late Rajmata) Sobhalata Devi. He is the present Zamindar of Kurupam, Vizianagram District, Andhra Pradesh. He belongs to the Konda Dora scheduled tribe community, and is from a family of tribal hill chiefs. He was educated in Madras, he holds an M.A. degree in Political Science and a B.A. degree in Economics from Madras Christian College, Madras (now Chennai).

Political career
Deo was a member of the Lok Sabha representing the Araku (ST) constituency (for 2009-2014) in the southern state of Andhra Pradesh. He has been a member of the Congress Working Committee (CWC) which is the highest decision-making body of the party. He was first elected to parliament in 1977 and has been elected to the Lok Sabha five times, and has also held one term in the Rajya Sabha (upper house of Parliament). On 12 July 2011 he was sworn in as a Cabinet Minister in the Union Cabinet, holding the portfolios of Tribal Affairs and Panchayati Raj.

He was also a Minister of State for Steel, Mines and Coal in the Central Cabinet in 1979-80. He has served on numerous parliamentary committees, and has been the chairperson of several key parliamentary committees, including the Joint Parliamentary Committee on the Scheduled Tribes and Other Traditional Forest Dwellers (Recognition of Forest Rights) Bill that led to the Forest Rights Act. He was also the Chairperson of the Parliamentary Committee on Public Undertakings (CoPU).

He headed the parliamentary investigation into the 2008 cash-for-votes scandal.

Deo is the author of the book Changing India's Political Mould, published in 1993. The book is on electoral and federal reforms in India.

Positions held
 Cabinet Minister -  Tribal and Panchayati Raj Affairs - July 2011 – May 2014
 Minister of State for Steel, Mines and Coal in the Central Cabinet - 1979-80

References

External links
 Detailed profile: V. Kishore Chandra Deo in india.gov.in website
 Biodata of Deo, V. Kishore Chandra S. at Rajya Sabha website.
Official biographical sketch in Parliament of India website

1947 births
Living people
India MPs 1977–1979
India MPs 1980–1984
India MPs 1984–1989
India MPs 2004–2009
India MPs 2009–2014
Telugu politicians
Indian National Congress politicians from Andhra Pradesh
Rajya Sabha members from Andhra Pradesh
Lok Sabha members from Andhra Pradesh
People from Vizianagaram district
Ministers of Tribal Affairs (India)
People from Uttarandhra
Indian National Congress (U) politicians
Indian Congress (Socialist) politicians